Haliotis exigua is a species of sea snail, a marine gastropod mollusk in the family Haliotidae, the abalones.

H. Pilsbry regarded Haliotis exigua as a juvenile of Haliotis diversicolor. It is unclear whether this species deserves recognition.

Description
The size of the shell attains 21 mm. The flat oval shell has an irregular sculpture. It is slightly canaliculate in the middle. It is densely spirally striate and lirate, but obsoletely plicate. The apex is prominent. It has a dark coloration of gray-red. The inner surface is vividly iridescent.

Distribution
This marine species occurs off Japan to Vietnam.

References

 W. Dunker (1877), Mollusca nonnulla nova maris Japonici. Malakozoologische Blätter 24: 67-75

External links

exigua
Gastropods described in 1877